Aristida calycina, commonly known as dark wiregrass, is a species of grass in the family Poaceae that is native in Australia.

Description
It is strongly branched and has wiry culms.

Taxonomy
The species was first formally described by the botanist Robert Brown in 1810 as part of the work Prodromus florae Novae Hollandiae et insulae Van-Diemen, exhibens characteres plantarum quas annis 1802-1805. Synonyms include Aristida glumaris, Chaetaria calicina and Aristida calycina var. typica.

There are three varieties of this species:
Aristida calycina R.Br. var. calycina
Aristida calycina var. filifolia B.K.Simon
Aristida calycina var. praealta Domin

Distribution
Aristida calycina is found mostly in the eastern states of mainland Australia, Queensland, Victoria, New South Wales and parts of the Northern Territory with a scattered distribution that thins toward the west. In New South Wales it is found in all areas apart from the far south west and grows in sandy poor soils.

See also
List of Aristida species

References

calycina
Flora of Australia
Plants described in 1810
Taxa named by Robert Brown (botanist, born 1773)